Ayat is Arabic plural of ayah, the smallest unit of the Qur'an it may also refer to

People

Given name
Ayat (rapper), rapper based in Accra, Ghana 
Ayat Abuznade, Palestinian-American humanitarian and activist
Ayat al-Akhras, suicide bomber from Palestine
Ayat Al-Qurmezi (born 1991), poet from Bahrain

Surname
Albert Ayat (1875–1935), French fencer
Félix Ayat (1882–1972), French fencer, brother of Albert

Places
Ayat (river), in Kazakhstan and Russia
Ayat-sur-Sioule, commune in central France
Bni Ayat, town and rural commune in Morocco

Other
Ayat an-Nur, the 35th verse of the 24th sura of the Qur'an
Ayat (band), black metal band based in Beirut, Lebanon
Ayat (Dune), term for "the signs of life" in the fictional universe of Dune 
Ayat-Ayat Cinta, Indonesian drama film 
Aayat (song), a song from the soundtrack of Bajirao Mastani

See also
Ayats, a Spanish coachbuilder